Eudocima is a genus of moths of the family Erebidae with numerous tropical species. The genus was first categorised by Gustaf Johan Billberg in 1820, and species currently in the genus have been placed under a range of other genera in the past. Adult moths in the genus are known for puncturing and feeding on the juices of fruits, because of which they are considered as pests by horticulturists.

Description
Palpi with second joint thickened and reaching vertex of head, and blunt naked third joint. Antennae minutely ciliated in male. Metathorax have slight tufts. Abdomen clothed with coarse hair on dorsum. Tibia spineless and clothed with long hair. Forewings with arched costa and acute apex. Inner margin lobed and with tufts of hair near base and at outer angle. Larva with four pairs of abdominal prolegs, where first pair rudimentary.

Species
The following species are recognized by Alberto Zilli and Willem Hogenes (2002).
 Eudocima anguina Schaus, 1911
 Eudocima apta Walker, 1857
 Eudocima aurantia Moore, 1877
 Eudocima bathyglypta Prout, 1928
 Eudocima behouneki Zilli & Hogenes, 2002
 Eudocima boseae Saalmüller, 1880
 Eudocima caesar Felder, 1861
 Eudocima cajeta Cramer, 1775
 Eudocima cocalus Cramer, 1777
 Eudocima collusoria Cramer, 1777
 Eudocima colubra Schaus, 1911
 Eudocima discrepans Walker, 1857
 Eudocima dividens Walker, 1857
 Eudocima divitiosa Walker, 1869
 Eudocima euryzona Hampson, 1926
 Eudocima felicia Stoll, 1790
 Eudocima formosa Griveaud & Viette, 1960
 Eudocima homaena Hübner, 1816
 Eudocima hypermnestra Cramer, 1780
 Eudocima imperator Boisduval, 1833
 Eudocima iridescens Lucas, 1894
 Eudocima jordani Holland, 1900
 Eudocima kinabaluensis Feige, 1976
 Eudocima kuehni Pagenstecher, 1886
 Eudocima materna Linnaeus, 1767
 Eudocima mazzeii Zilli & Hogenes, 2002
 Eudocima memorans Walker, 1857
 Eudocima mionopastea Hampson, 1926
 Eudocima muscigera Butler, 1882
 Eudocima nigricilia Prout, 1924
 Eudocima okurai Okano, 1964
 Eudocima paulii Robinson, 1968
 Eudocima phalonia Linnaeus, 1763
 Eudocima pratti Bethune-Baker, 1906
 Eudocima prattorum Prout, 1922
 Eudocima procus Cramer, 1777
 Eudocima prolai Zilli & Hogenes, 2002
 Eudocima salaminia Cramer, 1777
 Eudocima serpentifera Walker, 1857
 Eudocima sikhimensis Butler, 1895
 Eudocima smaragdipicta Walker, 1857
 Eudocima splendida Yoshimoto, 1999
 Eudocima strivijayana Bänziger, 1985
 Eudocima talboti Prout, 1922
 Eudocima toddi Zayas, 1965
 Eudocima treadawayi Zilli & Hogenes, 2002
 Eudocima tyrannus Guenée, 1852

References

External links

 Eudocima serpentifera in the US

 
Moth genera